Juan Alfonso Enríquez de Cabrera y Colonna, 5th Duke of Medina de Rioseco, (3 March 1599 – Madrid, Spain, 6 February 1647), he was hereditary 9th Admiral of Castile, and the 8th Count of Melgar

Juan Alfonso received his titles at the age of 3, when his father Luis III Enriquez de Cabrera died, under regency of his mother Italian Lady Vitoria Colonna (deceased 28 December 1633).
His mother, from Venezian and Roman families, was the daughter of Marcantonio II Colonna, (Civita Lavinia, 25 February 1535) – married, Rome, Italy, 29 April 1552 – Medinaceli, Spain, poisoned?, 1 August 1585),  3rd duke of Paliano, 1st duke of Tagliacozzo, count of Ceccano, lieutenant of the kingdom of Naples, Viceroy of Sicily, Knight of the Order of the Golden Fleece and Felice Orsini, deceased Rome, Italy 27 July 1596, the daughter of Girolamo Orsini, Sieur of Bracciano and Francesca Sforza, of the Counts of santa Fiora.
She had married Luis III Enriquez de Cabrera in Vich, Catalonia, Spain, on 31 December 1587.

In 1638, he raised the Siege of Fuenterrabía by defeating a superior French army under Henri, Prince of Condé.

For this, he was rewarded and became Viceroy of Sicily, 1641–1644,  Viceroy of Naples, 6 May 1644 – 1646, Member of the Spanish Council of war, member of the Royal Council of Spain, and Mayordomo mayor to the King.

He married in 1612, Luisa  de Sandoval Padilla, deceased 1664, daughter of Cristóbal de Sandoval, Duke of Uceda, (1577 – married 1597 –  1623), the eldest son of the 1st Duke of Lerma, the virtual Prime Minister of Spain at the time, also, first Duke of Uceda and 1st Duke of Cea.

He had only two children, a daughter who died young in Naples, and the eldest and only one to survive him, a son named Juan Gaspar (1625-1691).

Some references
http://www.grandesp.org.uk/historia/gzas/medinarioseco.htm (deadlinkj)

1599 births
1647 deaths
Counts of Spain
Dukes of Spain
Viceroys of Sicily
Viceroys of Naples
Italian nobility